Saso Island is an island off the coast of Saudi Arabia. It is part of the Farasan Islands. In the 15th century, there was a recognised navigation route to the west of the island. its size is about

References
http://paleodb.org/cgi-bin/bridge.pl?action=displayCollectionDetails&collection_no=55374  

Islands of Saudi Arabia
Islands of the Red Sea